A by-election for the City of Greater Geelong mayor occurred on 24 November 2013. This by-election was triggered by the resignation of Geelong's first directly elected mayor Keith Fagg and saw Darryn Lyons of the Liberal Party become Geelong's second directly elected mayor with a first-preference vote of 29.79%. Lyons' nearest rival, Stephanie Asher, achieved a primary vote of 14.43%.

Background 
Geelong's first directly elected mayor, Keith Fagg, resigned from his position in August 2013, just over a year following his election, citing health reasons.

Campaign 
Over the course of the mayoral campaign, the local media focused heavily on Darryn Lyons and former mayor Ken Jarvis.

On 6 November, the Geelong Advertiser hosted a Mayoral candidate forum with a crowd of over 600 people, and Ken Jarvis won the exit poll which was taken by 200 people.

Controversy arose when Geelong businessman Frank Costa publicly backed Jarvis; stating that the "state government wouldn't muck around" and that it "may intervene and sack the council if Ken Jarvis isn't elected". The next day, however, Victorian Premier Denis Napthine, along with Costa, denied claims that the council would be sacked.

Candidates
A total of 16 candidates ran in this election.:

References 

Elections in Victoria (Australia)
2013 elections in Australia
Mayoral elections in Australia
2010s in Victoria (Australia)
City of Greater Geelong
November 2013 events in Australia